Chuck Collins (born October 19, 1959) is an author and a senior scholar at the Institute for Policy Studies in Washington, DC, where he directs the Program on Inequality and the Common Good. He is also co-founder of Wealth for Common Good. He is an expert on economic inequality in the US, and has pioneered efforts to bring together investors and business leaders to speak out publicly against corporate practices and economic policies that increase economic inequality.

Collins is the great-grandson of Oscar F. Mayer, the founder of the Oscar Mayer meat processing brand.

Early life
Collins was born in Madison, Wisconsin and grew up in suburban Detroit where he attended the Cranbrook Schools.  At age 7, he witnessed the 1967 Detroit riots and became concerned about inequality. He was involved in social change, including Earth Day 1970. He raised money for guide dogs and informed his neighborhood about the environment at a young age.

Collins first gained public attention in 1985, when he gave an inheritance of $500,000 to several foundations at the age of 26. When his libertarian conservative father Edward learned of his intentions, he was afraid his son was a Marxist, though Collins instead stated that he would rather be called a "Gandhian or Christian" and later left to live in a commune.

Education
Collins is a graduate of Hampshire College (Bachelor of Arts, 1984), and holds a master's degree (1987) from the School of Community Economic Development at Southern New Hampshire University.

Career
Between 1983 and 1991, Collins worked at the Institute for Community Economics, based in Greenfield, Massachusetts, providing technical advice to community land trusts and mobile home resident cooperatives. Between 1991 and 1995, he was director of the HOME Coalition in Massachusetts and a field organizer for the Tax Equity Alliance of Massachusetts (now the Mass Budget and Policy Center). In 1995, he co-founded, with Felice Yeskel and S.M. Miller, United for a Fair Economy in Boston, Massachusetts, a left-leaning national organization devoted to education about growing income and wealth inequality.

In 2005, he became a senior scholar at the Institute for Policy Studies, where he co-edits the web site, Inequality.org, and directs the Program on Inequality and the Common Good.  In 2008, he cofounded Wealth for the Common Good, which subsequently merged in 2015 with the Patriotic Millionaires.

At the Institute for Policy Studies, Collins research has looked at income and wealth inequality and the racial wealth divide. He has co-authored a number of studies including "Billionaire Bonanza"  exploring the share of wealth flowing to the top 1 percent and Forbes 400, and the "Ever Growing Gap", which examines the future of the racial wealth divide.

Publications
Collins has written a number of books about inequality, tax policy and social change philanthropy. In 2000, he co-authored the book, Robin Hood Was Right: A Guide to Giving Your Money for Social Change. In 2000 (revised in 2005), he co-authored with Felice Yeskel, Economic Apartheid in America: A Primer on Economic Inequality and Insecurity. Collins is coauthor, with William H. Gates Sr, of the 2003 book, Wealth and Our Commonwealth: Why America Should Tax Accumulated Fortunes, which argues that the estate tax is both fair and necessary. In 2013, he authored  99 to 1: How Wealth Inequality is Wrecking the World and What We Can Do About It. Born on Third Base: A One Percenter Makes the Case for Tackling Inequality, Bringing Wealth Home, and Committing to the Common Good was published in 2016. In 2021 he published The Wealth Hoarders: How Billionaires Spend Millions to Hide Trillions.

Personal life

Collins is the great-grandson of German-born American meatpacker Oscar F. Mayer (founder of the Oscar Mayer food corporation), and is the grandson of the American pianist and composer Edward Joseph Collins. Collins lives in the Jamaica Plain neighborhood of Boston with his partner, his daughter, and his partner's children.

References

External links
 Book - 99 to 1: How Wealth Inequality is Wrecking the World and What We Can Do About It
 
 Patriotic Millionaires 
 Class Action 
 Inequality.org This website is a portal to statistics, news, and opinions on economic inequality in the US
 United for a Fair Economy site
 

1959 births
American economics writers
American male non-fiction writers
American socialists
Anti-globalization activists
Center for Economic and Policy Research
Hampshire College alumni
Living people
Michigan socialists
New Hampshire socialists
Southern New Hampshire University alumni
Wisconsin socialists
People from Jamaica Plain
American people of German descent